Jessye is both a given name and a surname. Notable people with the name include:

Eva Jessye (1895–1992), American conductor
Jessye Norman (1945–2019), American opera singer

See also
Jesse (given name)
Jesse (surname)